The Musée Péléféro Gbon Coulibaly is a museum located in Ivory Coast. It is located in Korhogo, Savanes District.

References

See also 
 List of museums in Ivory Coast

Museums in Ivory Coast
Buildings and structures in Savanes District
Korhogo